The newton-second (also newton second; symbol: N⋅s or N s) is the unit of impulse in the International System of Units (SI). It is dimensionally equivalent to the  momentum unit kilogram-metre per second (kg⋅m/s).  One newton-second corresponds to a one-newton force applied for one second. 

It can be used to identify the resultant velocity of a mass if a force accelerates the mass for a specific time interval.

Definition
Momentum is given by the formula:

  is the momentum in newton-seconds (N⋅s) or "kilogram-metres per second" (kg⋅m/s)
  is the mass in kilograms (kg)
  is the velocity in metres per second (m/s)

Examples
This table gives the magnitudes of some momenta for various masses and speeds.

See also 
Power factor
Newton-metre – SI unit of torque
Orders of magnitude (momentum) – examples of momenta

References

Classical mechanics
SI derived units
Units of measurement